Jimmy Mack MBE (1934–2004), born James F. McRitchie, was a Scottish broadcaster, best known for his work on BBC Radio Scotland and Radio Clyde.

Mack was born in Greenock, Scotland, on 26 June 1934. He was educated at Lenzie Academy and Bathgate Academy. He worked for the Guardian Royal Exchange insurance company from 1956 until 1970; his broadcasting career started in 1965 on the pirate radio station Radio Scotland 242, which was closed down in 1967 under the provisions of the Marine Broadcasting Offences Act. Thereafter, he joined the BBC in Glasgow, including working as a DJ on BBC Radio 1 and BBC Radio 2's Night Ride programme.

He moved to Kent, England, in 1970, becoming a presenter on the Chatham-based BBC Radio Medway (now BBC Radio Kent), plus occasional broadcasts on BBC Radio 2. He also produced some programmes for BBC Radio 4, such as You and Yours.

Following the launch of BBC Radio Scotland in 1978, Mack returned to Scotland in 1979, becoming presenter of the mid-morning programme (The Jimmy Mack Show), which in 1988 broadcast live from the Glasgow Garden Festival for a total of 108 consecutive outside broadcasts, a possible record for such a programme.

He became well-known on television in Scotland, with programmes for the BBC as well as Grampian Television and Scotland Today for STV.

In 1990, he left Radio Scotland to work for the commercial station Radio Clyde in the west of Scotland, becoming one of the station's main presenters on Clyde 2 from the launch on 3 January 1990. Mack presented the drivetime show for eight years and also presented the weekday breakfast show on occasions when main presenter Dave Marshall was off in the early 1990s, in addition to this, Mack presented some weekend specialist shows on Clyde 2 for most of the 1990s - Clyde Gold, Relax with Mack, Jimmy Mack's Chart Countdown and a 1960s show before taking over the early evening and weekend breakfast shows from September 1997 until July 2000, In 2001, he launched his own Saturday night show called Saturday Night with Jimmy Mack.  He was patron of the Scottish Motor Neurone Disease Association. His charity work led to him being awarded the MBE in 1996. He continued to broadcast on Radio Clyde until two weeks before his death from cancer on 3 July 2004. He was married, with a son and a daughter.

References

"Who's Who in Scotland" (2001 edition), published by Carrick Media, Irvine, Scotland,

External links
Radio Clyde 2 website - tribute to Jimmy Mack
Forth Radio Network 1962-1987
Jimmy Mack's entry on Gazetter for Scotland
http://www.offshoreradio.co.uk/djsm.htm#mack
http://news.bbc.co.uk/2/hi/uk_news/scotland/3864603.stm

Mack
Mack
Offshore radio broadcasters
Pirate radio personalities
Scottish television presenters
1934 births
2004 deaths
People from Greenock
People educated at Lenzie Academy